Mamadou Keita may refer to:
 Mamadou Keita (fencer)
 Mamadou Keita (basketball)
 Mamadou Keita (judoka)